Dad Loves His Work is the tenth studio album by James Taylor released in 1981. The album includes the duet with J. D. Souther titled "Her Town Too", which peaked at number 11 on the Billboard Hot 100 and number 5 on the Billboard Adult Contemporary chart. The album was certified Platinum in the United States. It was his first album without any covers.

Background
The album's title was a response by Taylor to then-wife Carly Simon, who had issued an ultimatum to Taylor regarding his constant touring, leaving her home with their two children, Benjamin and Sally.  Simon informed Taylor in 1980 that unless he curtailed his schedule to be home more with his family, that she would divorce him.  Shortly before the album's release, the pair separated, officially dissolving their 11-year marriage in 1983.  Taylor, who was still struggling with a lengthy history of drug abuse, later admitted that he was ill-equipped to be a family man at that time in his life and put his career before his family.

Track listing
All songs by James Taylor unless otherwise noted.

Side one
"Hard Times" – 3:13
"Her Town Too" (Duet with J.D. Souther) (Taylor, J. D. Souther, Waddy Wachtel) – 4:34
"Hour That the Morning Comes" – 2:56
"I Will Follow" – 4:19
"Believe It or Not" – 3:53

Side two
"Stand and Fight" (Taylor, Jacob Brackman) – 3:10
"Only for Me" – 4:55
"Summer's Here" – 2:43
"Sugar Trade" (Taylor, Jimmy Buffett, Timothy Mayer) – 2:48
"London Town" – 3:56
"That Lonesome Road" (Taylor, Don Grolnick) – 2:22

Personnel 
 James Taylor – lead vocals, acoustic guitar (3-10), bass harmonica (9)
 Bill Cuomo – synthesizers (1, 4)
 Don Grolnick – acoustic piano (1, 3, 5, 10, 11), organ (1-3, 7-9), Fender Rhodes (2, 5, 8, 10), keyboards (4) 
 Dan Dugmore – electric guitar (1-3, 6-8, 10), pedal steel guitar (4, 5)
 Waddy Wachtel – electric guitar (1, 4-8, 10), guitar solo (1), acoustic guitar (2), slide guitar (3)
 Leland Sklar – bass (1-10)
 Rick Marotta – drums (1-8, 10),  conga (1), percussion (5, 6), timbales (8)
 Peter Asher – percussion (6, 7), shaker (8)
 Greg "Fingers" Taylor – harmonica (6, 8, 10)
 Gene Page – string arrangements and conductor (2)
 David Lasley – backing vocals (1, 4, 6, 7, 10)
 Arnold McCuller – backing vocals (1, 4, 6, 7, 10)
 J.D. Souther – harmony vocals (2)

Choir on "That Lonesome Road"
 Peter Asher
 Jim Gilstrap
 Bernard Ighner
 David Lasley
 Arnold McCuller
 James Taylor
 Jennifer Warnes

Production 
 Producer – Peter Asher 
 Engineer – Val Garay 
 Assistant Engineer – Niko Bolas 
 Recorded at Record One (Los Angeles, CA).
 Piano and Keyboard Technician – Edd Kolakowski 
 Mastered by Doug Sax and Mike Reese at The Mastering Lab (Hollywood, CA).
 Photography – Aaron Rapoport 
 Art Direction and Design – John Kosh

Charts

Notes

1981 albums
James Taylor albums
Albums produced by Peter Asher
Columbia Records albums
Legacy Recordings albums